Utopian socialism is the term often used to describe the first current of modern socialism and socialist thought as exemplified by the work of Henri de Saint-Simon, Charles Fourier, Étienne Cabet, and Robert Owen. Utopian socialism is often described as the presentation of visions and outlines for imaginary or futuristic ideal societies, with positive ideals being the main reason for moving society in such a direction. Later socialists and critics of utopian socialism viewed utopian socialism as not being grounded in actual material conditions of existing society. These visions of ideal societies competed with revolutionary and social democratic movements.

As a term or label, utopian socialism is most often applied to, or used to define, those socialists who lived in the first quarter of the 19th century who were ascribed the label utopian by later socialists as a pejorative in order to imply naïveté and to dismiss their ideas as fanciful and unrealistic. A similar school of thought that emerged in the early 20th century which makes the case for socialism on moral grounds is ethical socialism.

One key difference between utopian socialists and other socialists such as most anarchists and Marxists is that utopian socialists generally do not believe any form of class struggle or social revolution is necessary for socialism to emerge. Utopian socialists believe that people of all classes can voluntarily adopt their plan for society if it is presented convincingly. They feel their form of cooperative socialism can be established among like-minded people within the existing society and that their small communities can demonstrate the feasibility of their plan for society. Because of this tendency, utopian socialism was also related to classical radicalism, a left-wing liberal ideology.

Development 

The term utopian socialism was introduced by Karl Marx in "For a Ruthless Criticism of Everything" in 1843 and then developed in The Communist Manifesto in 1848. The term was used by later socialist thinkers to describe early socialist or quasi-socialist intellectuals who created hypothetical visions of egalitarian, communal, meritocratic, or other notions of perfect societies without considering how these societies could be created or sustained.

In The Poverty of Philosophy, Marx criticized the economic and philosophical arguments of Proudhon set forth in The System of Economic Contradictions, or The Philosophy of Poverty. Marx accused Proudhon of wanting to rise above the bourgeoisie. In the history of Marx's thought and Marxism, this work is pivotal in the distinction between the concepts of utopian socialism and what Marx and the Marxists claimed as scientific socialism. Although utopian socialists shared few political, social, or economic perspectives, Marx and Engels argued that they shared certain intellectual characteristics. In The Communist Manifesto, Marx and Friedrich Engels wrote:The undeveloped state of the class struggle, as well as their own surroundings, causes Socialists of this kind to consider themselves far superior to all class antagonisms. They want to improve the condition of every member of society, even that of the most favored. Hence, they habitually appeal to society at large, without distinction of class; nay, by preference, to the ruling class. For how can people, when once they understand their system, fail to see it in the best possible plan of the best possible state of society? Hence, they reject all political, and especially all revolutionary, action; they wish to attain their ends by peaceful means, and endeavor, by small experiments, necessarily doomed to failure, and by the force of example, to pave the way for the new social Gospel.Marx and Engels associated utopian socialism with communitarian socialism which similarly sees the establishment of small intentional communities as both a strategy for achieving and the final form of a socialist society. Marx and Engels used the term scientific socialism to describe the type of socialism they saw themselves developing. According to Engels, socialism was not "an accidental discovery of this or that ingenious brain, but the necessary outcome of the struggle between two historically developed classes, namely the proletariat and the bourgeoisie. Its task was no longer to manufacture a system of society as perfect as possible, but to examine the historical-economic succession of events from which these classes and their antagonism had of necessity sprung, and to discover in the economic conditions thus created the means of ending the conflict". Critics have argued that utopian socialists who established experimental communities were in fact trying to apply the scientific method to human social organization and were therefore not utopian. On the basis of Karl Popper's definition of science as "the practice of experimentation, of hypothesis and test", Joshua Muravchik argued that "Owen and Fourier and their followers were the real 'scientific socialists.' They hit upon the idea of socialism, and they tested it by attempting to form socialist communities". By contrast, Muravchik further argued that Marx made untestable predictions about the future and that Marx's view that socialism would be created by impersonal historical forces may lead one to conclude that it is unnecessary to strive for socialism because it will happen anyway.

Social unrest between the employee and employer in a society results from the growth of productive forces such as technology and natural resources are the main causes of social and economic development. These productive forces require a mode of production, or an economic system, that’s based around private property rights and institutions that determine the wage for labor.  Additionally, the capitalist rulers control the modes of production. This ideological economic structure allows the bourgeoises to undermine the worker’s sensibility of their place in society, being that the bourgeoises rule the society in their own interests. These rulers of society exploit the relationship between labor and capital, allowing for them to maximize their profit. To Marx and Engels, the profiteering through the exploitation of workers is the core issue of capitalism, explaining their beliefs for the oppression of the working class. Capitalism will reach a certain stage, one of which it cannot progress society forward, resulting in the seeding of socialism. As a socialist, Marx theorized the internal failures of capitalism. He described how the tensions between the productive forces and the modes of production would lead to the downfall of capitalism through a social revolution. Leading the revolution would be the proletariat, being that the preeminence of the bourgeoise would end. Marx’s vision of his society established that there would be no classes, freedom of mankind, and the opportunity of self-interested labor to rid any alienation. In Marx’s view, the socialist society would better the lives of the working class by introducing equality for all. 

Since the mid-19th century, Engels overtook utopian socialism in terms of intellectual development and number of adherents. At one time almost half the population of the world lived under regimes that claimed to be Marxist. Currents such as Owenism and Fourierism attracted the interest of numerous later authors but failed to compete with the now dominant Marxist and Anarchist schools on a political level. It has been noted that they exerted a significant influence on the emergence of new religious movements such as spiritualism and occultism.

Utopian socialists were seen as wanting to expand the principles of the French revolution in order to create a more rational society. Despite being labeled as utopian by later socialists, their aims were not always utopian and their values often included rigid support for the scientific method and the creation of a society based upon scientific understanding.

In literature and in practice 

Robert Owen (1771–1858) was a successful Welsh businessman who devoted much of his profits to improving the lives of his employees. His reputation grew when he set up a textile factory in New Lanark, Scotland, co-funded by his teacher, the utilitarian Jeremy Bentham and introduced shorter working hours, schools for children and renovated housing. He wrote about his ideas in his book A New View of Society which was published in 1813 and An Explanation of the Cause of Distress which pervades the civilized parts of the world in 1823. He also set up an Owenite commune called New Harmony in Indiana. This collapsed when one of his business partners ran off with all the profits. Owen's main contribution to socialist thought was the view that human social behavior is not fixed or absolute and that humans have the free will to organize themselves into any kind of society they wished.

Charles Fourier (1772–1837) contributed significantly even if indirectly to the socialist movement. He rejected the Industrial Revolution altogether and thus the problems that arose with it. Fourier viewed societies of factories and moneymaking as cruel and inhumane. He thought industrial development turned human existence bland and left people unstimulated. Referring back to Adam Smith's Pin factory idea, although production was roaring, one's day was filled with the same monotonous tasks. Fourier proposed a system of harmony in which people would lead fulfilling and purposeful lives by following their passions. He imagined small communities called Phalanstere which would contain workshops, libraries, and even opera houses. He envisioned people of many different passions coming together to complete tasks they had to carry out. These passions would create 810 different character types. There would be the passion of the butterfly, the fondness of engaging in many different activities. The passion of the cabalist, the desire for intrigue and plots. There would be something to account for every person's true desires. There would be no wages, but instead, people would share the profits that the phalanstery made. Fourier waited for his phalansteries to be brought to life, but this did not occur to his disappointment. Fourier wrote about people growing tails with eyes on them, six moons appearing, and the seas would turn into lemonade after setting up his phalansteries. He also wrote that humans would form friendships with wild animals and have friendly anti-tigers carry people around on their backs. His writings often led to people thinking he was a mad man. However, his ideas and writings brought to light an important question that many utopian socialists faced: how will there be work that stimulated all parts of one's personality? Fourier made various fanciful claims about the ideal world he envisioned. His writings about turning work into play influenced the young Karl Marx and helped him devise his theory of alienation.contributed significantly even if indirectly to the socialist movement. Several colonies based on Fourier's ideas were founded in the United States by Albert Brisbane and Horace Greeley.contributed significantly even if indirectly to the socialist movement.

Many Romantic authors, most notably William Godwin and Percy Bysshe Shelley, wrote anti-capitalist works and supported peasant revolutions across early 19th century Europe. Étienne Cabet (1788–1856), influenced by Robert Owen, published a book in 1840 entitled Travel and adventures of Lord William Carisdall in Icaria in which he described an ideal communal society. His attempts to form real socialist communities based on his ideas through the Icarian movement did not survive, but one such community was the precursor of Corning, Iowa. Possibly inspired by Christianity, he coined the word communism and influenced other thinkers, including Marx and Engels.

Edward Bellamy (1850–1898) published Looking Backward in 1888, a utopian romance novel about a future socialist society. In Bellamy's utopia, property was held in common and money replaced with a system of equal credit for all. Valid for a year and non-transferable between individuals, credit expenditure was to be tracked via "credit-cards" (which bear no resemblance to modern credit cards which are tools of debt-finance). Labour was compulsory from age 21 to 40 and organised via various departments of an Industrial Army to which most citizens belonged. Working hours were to be cut drastically due to technological advances (including organisational). People were expected to be motivated by a Religion of Solidarity and criminal behavior was treated as a form of mental illness or "atavism". The book ranked as second or third best seller of its time (after Uncle Tom's Cabin and Ben Hur). In 1897, Bellamy published a sequel entitled Equality as a reply to his critics and which lacked the Industrial Army and other authoritarian aspects.

William Morris (1834–1896) published News from Nowhere in 1890, partly as a response to Bellamy's Looking Backwards, which he equated with the socialism of Fabians such as Sydney Webb. Morris' vision of the future socialist society was centred around his concept of useful work as opposed to useless toil and the redemption of human labour. Morris believed that all work should be artistic, in the sense that the worker should find it both pleasurable and an outlet for creativity. Morris' conception of labour thus bears strong resemblance to Fourier's, while Bellamy's (the reduction of labour) is more akin to that of Saint-Simon or in aspects Marx.

The Brotherhood Church in Britain and the Life and Labor Commune in Russia were based on the Christian anarchist ideas of Leo Tolstoy (1828–1910). Pierre-Joseph Proudhon (1809–1865) and Peter Kropotkin (1842–1921) wrote about anarchist forms of socialism in their books. Proudhon wrote What is Property? (1840) and The System of Economic Contradictions, or The Philosophy of Poverty (1847). Kropotkin wrote The Conquest of Bread (1892) and Fields, Factories and Workshops (1912). Many of the anarchist collectives formed in Spain, especially in Aragon and Catalonia, during the Spanish Civil War were based on their ideas. While linking to different topics is always useful to maximize exposure, anarchism does not derive itself from utopian socialism and most anarchists would consider the association to essentially be a marxist slur designed to reduce the credibility of anarchism amongst socialists.

Many participants in the historical kibbutz movement in Israel were motivated by utopian socialist ideas. Augustin Souchy (1892–1984) spent most of his life investigating and participating in many kinds of socialist communities. Souchy wrote about his experiences in his autobiography Beware! Anarchist! Behavioral psychologist B. F. Skinner (1904–1990) published Walden Two in 1948. The Twin Oaks Community was originally based on his ideas. Ursula K. Le Guin (1929-2018) wrote about an impoverished anarchist society in her book The Dispossessed, published in 1974, in which the anarchists agree to leave their home planet and colonize a barely habitable moon in order to avoid a bloody revolution.

Related concepts 
Some communities of the modern intentional community movement such as kibbutzim could be categorized as utopian socialist. Some religious communities such as the Hutterites are categorized as utopian religious socialists.

Classless modes of production in hunter-gatherer societies are referred to as primitive communism by Marxists to stress their classless nature.

Notable utopian socialists 

 Edward Bellamy
 Alphonse Toussenel
 Tommaso Campanella
 Etienne Cabet
 Icarians
 Victor Considérant
 David Dale
 Charles Fourier
 North American Phalanx
 The Phalanx
 King Gillette
 Jean-Baptiste Godin
 Laurence Gronlund
 Matti Kurikka
 John Humphrey Noyes
 Robert Owen
 Philippe Buonarroti
 Vaso Pelagić
 Henri de Saint-Simon
 William Thompson
 Wilhelm Weitling
 Gerrard Winstanley

Notable utopian communities 
Utopian communities have existed all over the world. In various forms and locations, they have existed continuously in the United States since the 1730s, beginning with Ephrata Cloister, a religious community in what is now Lancaster County, Pennsylvania.

 Owenite communities
 New Lanark, Scotland, 1786
 New Harmony, Indiana, 1814
 Fourierist communities
 Brook Farm, Massachusetts, 1841
 La Reunion (Dallas), Texas, 1855
 North American Phalanx, New Jersey, 1843
 Silkville, Kansas, 1870
 Utopia, Ohio, 1844
 Icarian communities
 Corning, Iowa, 1860
 Anarchist communities
 Home, Washington, 1898
 Life and Labor Commune, Moscow Oblast, Soviet Union (Russia), 1921
 Socialist Community of Modern Times, New York, 1851
 Whiteway Colony, United Kingdom, 1898
 Others

 Fairhope Alabama, USA, 1894
 Kaweah Colony, California, 1886
 Llano del Rio, California, 1914
 Los Mochis, Sinaloa, Mexico, 1893
 Nevada City, Nevada, 1916
 New Australia, Paraguay, 1893
 Oneida Community, New York, 1848
 Ruskin Colony, Tennessee, 1894
 Rugby, Tennessee, 1880
 Sointula, British Columbia, Canada, 1901

See also 

 Pre-Marx socialists
 Pre-Marxist communism
 Christian socialism
 Communist utopia
 Diggers
 Ethical socialism
 Futurism
 History of socialism
 Ideal (ethics)
 Intentional communities
 Kibbutz
 List of anarchist communities
 Marxism
 Nanosocialism
 Post-capitalism
 Post-scarcity
 Radicalism (historical)
 Ricardian socialism
 Scientific socialism
 Socialism
 Socialist economics
 Syndicalism
 Utopia for Realists
 Yellow socialism
 Zero waste

References

Further reading 
 Taylor, Keith (1992). The political ideas of Utopian socialists. London: Cass. .

External links 
 
 Be Utopian: Demand the Realistic by Robert Pollin, The Nation, March 9, 2009.

 
History of social movements
Idealism
Radicalism (historical)
Social theories
Socialism
Syndicalism
Types of socialism